Ocotea gabonensis is a species of plant in the family Lauraceae.

It is an evergreen tree in the genus Ocotea.

It is endemic to Gabon.

References

gabonensis
Endemic flora of Gabon
Trees of Africa
Near threatened flora of Africa
Taxonomy articles created by Polbot